The IBM 3624 was released in 1978 as a second-generation automatic teller machine (ATM), a successor to the IBM 3614. Designed at the IBM Los Gatos lab, the IBM 3624, along with the later IBM 4732 model, was manufactured at IBM facilities in Charlotte, North Carolina and Havant, England until all operations were sold to Diebold, tied to the formation of the InterBold partnership between IBM and Diebold. 
Comparable ATM units marketed by other companies at the time were the Diebold TABS 9000 and NCR 5xxx.

Versions and features
The 3624 was marketed in eight different versions. The 3624 Version 8 incorporated use of a six-row by forty-column dot-matrix customer display, four line by 34 character statement / journal printer, labeled function / account keys, one to two currency cartridges and an optional depository. Earlier models, such as the Version 2, featured a smaller two-line display.

Unusual by today's standards, the customer's ATM card was inserted with the magnetic stripe up. Modern ATMs typically are built to expect customers to insert their card with the magnetic strip facing down (with the added benefit of the card issuer's logo being displayed to the customer on insert), although this can be changed to the opposite orientation.

The transaction records printed by the 3624 and used by customers to verify their transactions were approximately 3 inches square and on similar card stock to punch cards. When performing deposits, customers were instructed to place a special transaction record inside of the deposit envelope to aid in the processing of the transaction by the back-office staff.

An unfortunate design characteristic of the 3624 was that the vault that contained the cash dispenser was located in the upper area of the unit, making it top-heavy. This made the 3624 an extremely awkward machine to transport up and down stairs. Another complaint against the 3624 was the relatively small size of the cash cartridges (used to give money to customers) in comparison to other vendors' equipment at the time.

As was typical for ATM hardware of this era, the IBM 3624 had a two distinct high-level communications protocols. The first, a direct mainframe attachment through SDLC links was an IBM SNA LU0 protocol. The second was an attachment to the IBM 3600 and 4700 series of banking equipment, and was a start stop TDM loop with time slots assigned to specific 36xx series equipment at 1200 bit/sec.

The IBM 3612, 3624 and 3600 communications protocols were incompatible with other ATM vendor's high-level communications protocols.

The 3624 was eventually replaced by the IBM 473x series of ATMs which were unsuccessful. Part of the reason for the failure of the IBM 473x to take hold in the ATM marketplace was the lack of a backward compatibility to the 3624 protocol when it was introduced.

One of the most lasting features introduced with the 3624 was the IBM 3624 PIN block format used in transmission of an encrypted personal identification number (PIN). The PIN functions, with an early commercial encryption using the DES algorithm, were implemented in two modules - BQKPERS and BQKCIPH - and their export controlled under the US export munitions rules.

References

External links
 A brief mention of the 3624 protocol from IBM

Automated teller machines
Diebold
3624